The 2006–2008 European Nations Cup (ENC) Second Division (a European rugby union competition for national teams) will be contested over two years during which all teams meet each other home and away.  The winner of Division 2A, Germany, will be promoted to Division 1 and fifth place, Netherlands, relegated to Division 2B.  The winner, Poland, and loser of Division 2B shall be promoted to Division 2A and relegated to Division 3A, respectively.

In 2006 Ukraine was relegated from the First Division to Division 2A and Latvia promoted from Division 3A to 2B. The other teams joined from Round 3 of the qualification for the World Cup 2007. Spain, the winner of Round 3 of WC qual., was thereby promoted to the First Division in 2006.

Division 2A

 In the event of a tie the following rules apply: champion to be decided by 1. Winner of the games between tied teams 2. Best difference points for and against in all pool matches 3. Best difference between tried in all pool matches 4. Higher number of points 5. Higher number of tries 
Germany was promoted because they won on aggregate in the two games played between them and Belgium (32 – 13 and 18 – 32 giving an aggregate of 50 – 45).

Division 2B

 Andorra was relegated because they lost on aggregate in the two games played between them and Malta (24 – 24 and 17 – 16 giving an aggregate of 41 – 47).

Notes

See also
 2006-2008 European Nations Cup First Division
 2006-2008 European Nations Cup Third Division

2006–08
2006–07 in European rugby union
2007–08 in European rugby union
European Nations Cup Second Division
European Nations Cup Second Division
European Nations Cup Second Division
Germany at the European Nations Cup